Hartnagel is a German surname. Notable people with the surname include:

 Anke Hartnagel (1942–2004), German politician
 Christian Härtnagel (born 1982), German businessman
 Fritz Hartnagel (1917–2001), German lawyer and soldier

See also 
 Charlotte Schneidewind-Hartnagel (born 1953), German politician
 Elisabeth Hartnagel-Scholl (1920–2020), German centenarian
 Hartagel River

German-language surnames